"All the King's Horses" is a song written by Johnny Cunningham. It was recorded by American country music artist Lynn Anderson and released as a single in January 1976 via Columbia Records.

Background and release
"All the King's Horses" was recorded at the Columbia Studio, located in Nashville, Tennessee. The sessions was produced by Glenn Sutton, Anderson's longtime production collaborator at the label and her first husband.

"All the King's Horses" became a major hit when it reached number 20 on the Billboard Hot Country Singles chart in 1976. It became an even bigger hit on the Canadian RPM Country Songs chart, reaching number five the same year. The song was issued on Anderson's 1976 studio album of the same name.

Track listings 
7" vinyl single
 "I've Never Loved Anymore More" – 2:45
 "All I Have to Do Is Just Love You" – 2:07

Chart performance

References

1976 singles
1976 songs
Columbia Records singles
Lynn Anderson songs
Song recordings produced by Glenn Sutton